Summit Township is the name of some places in the U.S. state of Michigan:

 Summit Township, Jackson County, Michigan
 Summit Township, Mason County, Michigan

See also

Summit Township (disambiguation)

Michigan township disambiguation pages